Pandaul is a town in Madhubani district. It is a part of the Madhubani Vidhan Sabha constituency and the Madhubani Lok Sabha constituency. Pandaul is a block, and has a middle and high school as well as a engineering college. Pandaul has industrial areas to promote industrial sectors. Pandaul is connected to    NH 527 by a main road. It also has a railway station. There is a temple of Lord Shiva in Bhawanipur called Ugna Mahadev Mandir, located about 3 km from Pandaul. This place has a Kaali puja celebration which happens each year during Diwali. Sohray village is 3 km from main City. There is one more temple at Brahmotra chowk, it is a temple of Lord Rama, built by Raj Darbhanga.

Results

1977-2005
In the October 2005 state assembly elections, Vinod Narayan Jha of BJP won the Pandaul assembly seat, defeating his nearest rival, Naiyar Azam of RJD. Contests in most years were multi cornered but only winners and runners are being mentioned. Naiyar Azam of RJD defeated Vinod Narayan Jha of BJP in February 2005, Devendra Prasad Singh of BPSP in 2000, and Kumud Ranjan Jha of Congress in 1995. Kumud Ranjan Jha of Congress defeated Naiyar Azam representing JD in 1990 and representing JP in 1985, and Vijay Kumar Mishra of Janata Party (JP) in 1980, Binod Kumar Mishra had played a pivotal role in this elections. Siya Ram Yadav of JP defeated Kumud Ranjan Jha of Congress in 1977.

Cuisine
Pandaul is famous for its sweets delicacy, especially Gaja or well known as Balushahi.

References

Former assembly constituencies of Bihar
Politics of Madhubani district